The laRegioneTicino (English:  The Ticino Region) is a Swiss Italian-language daily newspaper, based in Bellinzona, Ticino with regional divisions in Locarno, Lugano and Chiasso. It was founded in 1992 from the merger of Il Dovere and L'Eco di Locarno. The newspaper's editor-in-chief is Giacomo Salvioni. 

It has a readership of 112,000.

See also
 List of newspapers in Switzerland

References

External links
laregione.ch (in Italian), the newspaper's official website

1992 establishments in Switzerland
Companies based in Bellinzona
Culture in Ticino
Daily newspapers published in Switzerland
Italian-language newspapers published in Switzerland
Publications established in 1992